The International School of the Gothenburg Region (ISGR AB) is an international school in Gothenburg, Sweden fully owned and founded by GR, the Gothenburg Region Association of Local Authorities. Partly private and partly public, the school offers the International Baccalaureate (IB) and the Swedish National Programme for grades K-10. The school has been an IB World School since August 2000, and CIS-accredited as of March 2008.

The school consists of two campuses. The South Campus for grades 0-5 is located at Guldhedsgatan while the North Campus for grades 6-10 is located on Molinsgatan, in metropolitan Gothenburg. Both campuses are connected to the transport System of Gothenburg; the North Campus is located at the tram stop "Kapellplatsen" while the South Campus is located at "Wavrinskys Plats", which is only two stops away from the other campus. The gym is located on the South Campus.

The Head of school is Birgitta Sandström Barac and the principal is currently Graham Miselbach. The deputy principal for the Gotaberg campus is Corinna Ljungberg and the deputy principal for the Guldheden campus is Marilyn James. Former Head of the school was Tage Gumaelius.

Currently, 90 teachers work at ISGR and teach over 1000 students who are from 65 different countries.

The National Programme LGR M & P 
The National Programme at ISGR offers a Swedish education for grades 0 - 9 students. As in the International Programme, all the grade 0 - 5 students are situated at the South Campus, and all grade 6 - 9 students are situated at the North Campus. Admission priority is given to residents living in central Gothenburg, Majorna, Linné and Örgryte.

The International Programme  MYP & PYP 
The International programme begins from PYP 0 up to the diploma programme, also known as MYP 10. The PYP section (0-5) is located on the Guldheden campus, and the MYP programme (6-10) is located on the Götaberg campus. Originally the 6th grade was located in the Guldheden campus, but due to lack of space was relocated to the Götaberg campus. Priority is given to students from outside or who have lived outside Sweden.

Minecraft Server
The school Minecraft server was created by a student for members of ISGR and their friends/families. The ip is "isgrmc.org" and the server was playable on both Bedrock and Java editions of Minecraft. The Minecraft server was an SMP (survival multiplayer) and did not allow use of obscene language and bullying. As of September 2022 the server was closed due to the owner graduating.

Lunch
The food that the students get from the cafeteria (locally known as "bamba") comes from Hvitfeldtska Gymnasiet. MYP 8 and above students have the privilege to go off campus and often go out to buy food as the school is located close to the city. The food provided is usually pasta, fish, meat, rice, and sometimes hamburgers or burritos. There is always a vegetarian option.

Exchange Programs
Currently, the school has 3 ongoing exchange programs, 10th grade offers two opportunities for students taking Spanish or French, going to Spain and France respectively. While 7th graders taking Spanish also have the chance to go to Spain.

School fees and government subsidy
All of the school's stocks are owned by the Gothenburg Region Association of Local Authorities. Due to the increased costs and limited government subsidy from the school offering the international programme, the school has to charge school fees to all international students in the International Section (except for year 10 students). The cost for the 2022-2023 academic year is 40,470 SEK or approximately 4000 USD. The students who have remained at the school since 2009 only have to pay 5000 SEK a year.

The student's municipality that they are registered as living in pays a subsidy for their student. The students of the school are often the offspring of people working for multi-national companies, most commonly Volvo, SKF, and AstraZeneca.

References

ISGR website
The Primary Years Programme at IBO's website
The Middle Years Programme at IBO's website

International schools in Sweden
International Baccalaureate schools in Sweden
Educational institutions established in 1964
1964 establishments in Sweden